Russell Findlay may refer to:
 Russell Findlay (businessman)
 Russell Findlay (politician)